In technology, soft lithography is a family of techniques for fabricating or replicating structures using "elastomeric stamps, molds, and conformable photomasks". It is called "soft" because it uses elastomeric materials, most notably PDMS.

Soft lithography is generally used to construct features measured on the micrometer to nanometer scale. According to Rogers and Nuzzo (2005), development of soft lithography expanded rapidly from 1995 to 2005.  Soft lithography tools are now commercially available.

Types 
 PDMS stamp
 Microcontact printing
 Multilayer soft lithography
 Nanosphere lithography

Advantages

Soft lithography has some unique advantages over other forms of lithography (such as photolithography and electron beam lithography). They include the following:
Lower cost than traditional photolithography in mass production
Well-suited for applications in biotechnology
Well-suited for applications in plastic electronics
Well-suited for applications involving large or nonplanar (nonflat) surfaces
More pattern-transferring methods than traditional lithography techniques (more "ink" options)
Does not need a photo-reactive surface to create a nanostructure
Smaller details than photolithography in laboratory settings (~30 nm vs ~100 nm). The resolution depends on the mask used and can reach 6 nm.

See also 
 Nanolithography

References

Further reading 
 
 
 
 

Lithography (microfabrication)